{{DISPLAYTITLE:C11H22}}
The molecular formula C11H22 (molar mass: 154.29 g/mol, exact mass: 154.1722 u) may refer to:

 Cycloundecane
 Undecene